The 2012 General Cup was a professional non-ranking snooker tournament that took place between 11–14 September 2012 at the General Snooker Club in Hong Kong.

Stephen Lee was the defending champion, but did not participate this year.

Neil Robertson won the title by defeating Ricky Walden 7–6 in the final.

Wildcard round

Round robin stage

Group A

 Fung Kwok Wai 2–5 Liang Wenbo
 Neil Robertson 5–2 Liang Wenbo
 Neil Robertson 3–5 Fung Kwok Wai

Group B

 Ricky Walden 5–3 Tian Pengfei
 Mark Davis 5–3 Tian Pengfei
 Ricky Walden 5–2 Mark Davis

Final

References 

2012
2012 in snooker
2012 in Hong Kong sport